Edward Regis "Ed" Policy (born October 6, 1970) is an American football executive and the current Chief Operating Officer and General Counsel for the Green Bay Packers. Previously, Policy was the Commissioner of the Arena Football League.

Early life and education 
Policy was born in Youngstown, Ohio to San Francisco 49ers and Cleveland Browns executive Carmen Policy, and Gail Policy. Policy attended the Holy Family grade school and played youth football for the Poland Bulldogs. He attended and graduated from Cardinal Mooney High School in Youngstown, Ohio. He played from 1985–1988 seasons as an offensive guard and linebacker. In 1987 Policy's team won the Ohio state high school football championship.

Policy earned a Bachelor of Business Administration from Notre Dame, and went on to graduate from Stanford Law School in 1996.

Career

Early career 
Policy worked for the law firm Heller Ehrman in San Francisco and then the Cleveland-based Thompson Hine LLP, where he worked on sports facility construction.

Arena Football League 
Policy began working for the Arena Football League in 2001, eventually briefly becoming Commissioner of the league when he took over on an interim basis for Commissioner C. David Baker, who stepped down two days before the 2008 ArenaBowl. Because the league subsequently shut down for the 2009 season, with the initial corporate organization filing for bankruptcy, the only actual AFL game contested during Policy's tenure as commissioner was the 2008 ArenaBowl (ArenaBowl XXII).

National Football League 
Beginning in 2009 Policy worked as a consultant for the National Football League, but left prior to the 2011 NFL lockout.

Green Bay Packers 
In 2012 the Green Bay Packers hired Policy to serve as Vice President and general counsel. He was promoted to Chief Operating Officer and general counsel in January 2018. The Packers said in a statement that Policy would, “take on a greater role in overseeing the business operations of the organization…" Since being named COO, Policy has overseen the development of the Packers' Titletown District.

In February 2020, amid rumors that Green Bay was successful in their bid to host the 2022 NFL Draft, Policy said that the NFL had not awarded the rights to host the draft to Green Bay or any other city, but that the Packers would, "aggressively pursue the opportunity."

Green Bay Packers head coach Matt LaFleur confirmed that he signed a contract extension with the club in the months following the 2021 season, for which he publicly expressed gratitude toward Policy (and others key executives in the organization) for the opportunity to remain in Green Bay.

References

Living people
Arena Football League commissioners
Green Bay Packers executives
Businesspeople from Youngstown, Ohio
University of Notre Dame alumni
Stanford Law School alumni
Sportspeople from Youngstown, Ohio
1970 births
21st-century American businesspeople